"Inhale" is a song by American rock band Stone Sour, featured on their 2002 debut album Stone Sour. Released as the third single by the band in July 2003, the song charted at number 18 on the American Billboard Hot Mainstream Rock Tracks chart, while reaching number 63 on the UK Singles Chart. The song was nominated for the Grammy Award for Best Metal Performance at the 2004 ceremony, losing out to Metallica's "St. Anger".

Music video
The music video for "Inhale" was directed by Gregory Dark and produced by Sharlotte Blake (executive) and Patti Tessel (line). It shows the band members as homeless people in their daily activities.  Corey pushes a trolley containing clothes, Jim plays the guitar on the street for money, Joel collects donations, Josh rummages in trash cans for food, and Shawn eats food given to him by roadside vendors.  Towards the second chorus the band is seen in white tuxedos, performing in front of an audience.  Shawn is seen playing a double bass instead of a normal bass guitar.  At the start of the chorus, the band changes to their shaggy unkempt look and their suits are frayed and torn.  As Corey starts the chorus, the people in the audience start disappearing one by one.  After the final chorus the band is seen back at their area around a fire.  It is revealed that the performance is just an imagination.  The video ends with the band going off to sleep, with Corey looking one last time at the fire.

Track listing

Chart positions

Personnel
Stone Sour
Corey Taylor – vocals, production
James Root – guitar, production
Josh Rand – guitar, production
Shawn Economaki – bass, production
Joel Ekman – drums, production
Additional personnel
Denny Gibbs – Hammond organ on "Inhale"
Tom Tatman – production, mixing on "Inhale" 
Toby Wright – mixing on "Inhale" and "Inside the Cynic"

References

2003 singles
Stone Sour songs
2002 songs
Roadrunner Records singles
Songs written by Shawn Economaki
Songs written by Josh Rand
Music videos directed by Gregory Dark